Michael Legge may refer to:

Michael Legge (comedian) (born 1968), Northern Irish comedian
Michael Legge (actor) (born 1978), Northern Ireland-born actor
Michael Legge (filmmaker) (born 1953), American actor and independent filmmaker

See also
Mike Legg (born 1975), ice hockey player